Consider This is the second studio album by Canadian country music singer Aaron Pritchett. It was released on August 10, 2002, by Royalty Records. "Consider This" and "You Can't Say I Didn't Love You" were released as singles.

Track listing
"Consider This" (Aaron Pritchett, Rick Tippe) - 3:16
"You Can't Say I Didn't Love You" (Trey Bruce, Craig Wiseman) - 4:12
"What Some People Throw Away" (Tom Paden, Kelly Shiver, Philip White) - 3:37
"Heart Like a Hurricane" (George Wolf) - 3:45
"The Last Goodbye" (Pritchett) - 3:26
"Bad for Good" (Brett Beavers, Jim Beavers, Troy VanHaefen) - 2:51
"Perfectly Blue" (Joe Mack Cherry, Mark Dorion) - 3:34
"Tip Jars and Tear Drops" (M. Bombeim, J. Williams) - 4:03

References

External links
[ allmusic ((( Consider This > Overview )))]

2002 albums
Aaron Pritchett albums
Royalty Records albums